Joe Rudolph is the offensive line coach for the Notre Dame football team under head coach Marcus Freeman. Prior to this position he was the Run Game Coordinator, and offensive line coach at Virginia Tech. Before his time at Virginia Tech, he was the associate head coach, offensive coordinator, and offensive line coach at the University of Wisconsin–Madison as well as the interim head coach and offensive coordinator of the University of Pittsburgh Panthers football team. He is a former guard in the National Football League for both the San Francisco 49ers and the Philadelphia Eagles.

Biography
Rudolph was born on July 21, 1972 in Charleroi, Pennsylvania. and is married to Dawn DeCaria Rudolph of Weirton, West Virginia.  Together they have three sons. He attended the University of Wisconsin-Madison, where he was a team captain on the football team, and the Tepper School of Business at Carnegie Mellon University.

Professional playing career
Rudolph played with the Philadelphia Eagles in 1995. After spending 1996 away from the NFL, he returned in 1997 to play with the San Francisco 49ers.

Coaching career
Rudolph's first coaching experience was as a graduate assistant with the Ohio State Buckeyes. In 2007, Rudolph served as Tight Ends Coach of the Nebraska Cornhuskers. While there he also worked on special teams and oversaw the punt team. He then served as the tight ends coach of the Wisconsin Badgers football team from 2008 to 2011.

Head coaching record

*Rudolph served as interim coach after Paul Chryst left for Wisconsin after the regular season.  Pittsburgh credits the regular season to Chryst and the Armed Forces Bowl to Rudolph.

See also
List of Philadelphia Eagles players

References

Living people
American football offensive guards
Nebraska Cornhuskers football coaches
Ohio State Buckeyes football coaches
Philadelphia Eagles players
Pittsburgh Panthers football coaches
San Francisco 49ers players
Wisconsin Badgers football coaches
Wisconsin Badgers football players
Tepper School of Business alumni
1972 births
People from Charleroi, Pennsylvania